Maghojoa is an administrative ward in the Singida Rural district of the Singida Region of Tanzania. In 2016 the Tanzania National Bureau of Statistics report there were 9,857 people in the ward, from 8,983 in 2012.

References

Wards of Singida Region